Rushyendramani (1 January 1917 – 17 August 2002) was an Indian actress, singer, dancer, and playback singer from South India. She had more than 150 movies to her credit and acted in Telugu, Tamil, Kannada, Malayalam and Hindi films from the 1935 to 1986. Her notable films include Sri Seetarama Jananam (1944), Malliswari (1951), Vipra Narayana (1954), Chintamani (1956). Her last film was Sri Shirdi Saibaba Mahathyam (1986).

Early life
She was born in Vijayawada on 1 January 1917.

A trained singer in both the Indian classical music traditions and a trained Kuchipudi and Bharatanatyam dancer, she started her career on stage at the age of seven. She donned the mantle of Krishna and Prahalada by the age of ten. Later she joined Lakshmi Vilasa Nataka Sabha of Kommuri Pattabhi Ramayya. She was trained under Kapilavai Ramanatha Sastry, Puvvula Ramatilakam and acted in the dramas Chintamani and Savitri.

She moved to the silver screen and acted as Satyabhama in Srikrishna Tulabaram, produced by Rajarao Naidu in 1935. It was a commercial failure, but she won acclaim for her singing and acting prowess. She joined the Rajarajeswari Natya Mandali of Kadaru Nagabhushanam and P. Kannamba and extensively toured entire Andhra Pradesh, Karnataka, parts of Maharashtra, Orissa and Tamil Nadu. She earned accolades for her portrayal of Prabhavati in Rangoon Rowdi and Narada in Savitri. Her popularity and acting prowess crowned her as the "Rayalaseema Rani".

Married to Javvadi Ramakrishna Rao Naidu in 1939, an accomplished musician and composer who scored music to many stage plays, she accompanied him to Madras. Ramakrishna Rao worked as music director in the Tamil film Mathru Bhoomi. As with many actors of that era, she was a great singer too.

Her first film was Sri Krishna Tulabharam (1935), where she played the role of Satyabhama.  She acted in Patni (1942) as Kannagi based on the Tamil epic Shilappadikaram. The Kovalan character was played by K. S. Prakash Rao. With the success of this film, she reached the pinnacle in the film world. She acted as Adilaxmi in Chenchu Lakshmi, which was also successful. She was in Seeta Rama Jananam in 1944, followed by Malliswari, Vipra Narayana, Maya Bazar, Jagadeka Veeruni Katha, Aggi Ramudu, Sri Krishna Satya and Panduranga Mahatyam, and portrayed a variety of characters. With over 150 films in all the major South Indian languages and Hindi, she was awarded the title of "Madhura Gaana Saraswati" by the Raja of Karvetinagaram for her singing skills.
She also acted with her granddaughter Bhavani in the 1974 Kannada film Bhootayyana Maga Ayyu, where Bhavani won the best actress award and Rushyendrami won the award for the best supporting actor.

She died on 17 August 2002 at Chennai. She was survived by two daughters and one son, grandchildren and great grandchildren.

Filmography
 Srikrishna Thulabhaaram (1935)
 Patni (1942) as Kannagi
 Seeta Rama Jananam (1942) (actor and playback singer)
 Chenchu Lakshmi (1943) (actor and playback singer)
 Dharmangada (1949)
 Malliswari (1951) as Nagamma
 Sri Kalahastiswara Mahatyam (1954)
 Vipranarayana (1954)
 Aggi Ramudu (1954)
 Mangalyam (1954) (Tamil)
 Guna Sundari (1955)
 Missamma (1955) as Gopalam's wife
 Maya Bazaar (1957/I) as Subhadra (actor and playback singer)
 Maya Bazaar (1957/II) as Subhadra (actor and playback singer)
 Panduranga Mahatyam (1957) as Laxmi
 Chenchu Lakshmi (1958/I)
 Abalai Anjugam (1959)
 Deepavali (1960) as Devas mother Aditi
 Sri Venkateswara Mahatyam (1960) as Dhaaranidevi
 Jagadeka Veeruni Katha (1961) as Maharani
 Gulebakavali Katha (1962)
 Gundamma Katha (1962)
 Palattu Koman (1962)
 Sri Krishnarjuna Yudham (1963) as Wife of Gaya
 Ramudu Bheemudu (1964)
 Enga Veetu Pillai(1965)
 Navarathri (1966) as Brothel house Head
 Pidugu Ramudu (1966)
 Sri Krishnavataram (1967/I)
 Bhootayyana Maga Ayyu (1974)
 Srimadvirat Veerabrahmendra Swami Charitra (1984)
 Sri Shirdi Saibaba Mahathyam (1986)

References

External links
 

1917 births
20th-century Indian actresses
2002 deaths
Telugu actresses
Actresses in Telugu cinema
Indian film actresses
Women artists from Andhra Pradesh
Telugu playback singers
Indian women playback singers
Singers from Andhra Pradesh
Indian female dancers
Film musicians from Andhra Pradesh
Artists from Vijayawada
Indian stage actresses
20th-century Indian singers
Actresses from Vijayawada
Actresses in Tamil cinema
Actresses in Malayalam cinema
Actresses in Kannada cinema
Actresses in Hindi cinema
Actresses in Telugu theatre
20th-century Indian women singers